Wheelin' & Dealin is an album by Frank Wess, John Coltrane, Paul Quinichette, Mal Waldron, Doug Watkins and Art Taylor released in April 1958 by Prestige Records. It was later reissued on New Jazz Records in 1964. On a small number of reissues, it is credited to "The Prestige All Stars", a name used by Prestige for various combinations of musicians who were under contract to the label.  The compact disc reissue adds two alternate takes that did not appear on the initial vinyl releases.

Track listing
All tracks composed by Mal Waldron, except where noted.
 "Things Ain't What They Used to Be" (Mercer Ellington, Ted Persons) – 8:27
 "Wheelin'" (Take 2) – 11:22
 "Wheelin'" (Take 1) – 10:25 Bonus track on CD reissue
 "Robbins' Nest" (Illinois Jacquet, Bob Russell, Sir Charles Thompson) – 15:33
 "Dealin'" (Take 2) – 10:16
 "Dealin'" (Take 1) – 9:59 Bonus track on CD reissue

Personnel
 John Coltrane – tenor saxophone
 Paul Quinichette – tenor saxophone
 Frank Wess – tenor saxophone, flute
 Mal Waldron – piano
 Doug Watkins – bass
 Art Taylor – drums

References

1958 albums
John Coltrane albums
Prestige Records albums
Frank Wess albums